The 1934 New York state election was held on November 6, 1934, to elect the governor, the lieutenant governor, the state comptroller, the attorney general, a U.S. Senator, two U.S. Representatives-at-large, the chief judge and two associate judges of the New York Court of Appeals, as well as all members of the New York State Assembly and the New York State Senate.

History
The Communist State Committee met on August 28, and nominated Israel Amter for governor.

The Socialist state convention met on July 1 at New York City, and nominated Charles Solomon for governor; and Norman Thomas for the U.S. Senate.

The Democratic state convention met on September 27 at Buffalo, New York, and re-nominated the incumbents Lehman, Bray, Tremaine, Bennett, Loughran and Copeland; and completed the ticket endorsing two Republicans: Associate Judge Frederick E. Crane for Chief Judge and Supreme Court Justice Edward R. Finch for the Court of Appeals.

The Republican state convention met on September 28 at Rochester, New York, and nominated New York City Park Commissioner Robert Moses for governor on the third ballot after a struggle with the Macy faction, defeating Samuel Seabury and Seabury C. Mastick. Also nominated were Fred J. Douglas for lieutenant governor; Wilson R. Campbell, of Steuben County, for comptroller; William T. Powers, of Brooklyn, for attorney general; E. Harold Cluett for the U.S. Senate; Frederick E. Crane for chief judge; the incumbent Democrat John T. Loughran to succeed himself; and Charles B. Sears for the Court of Appeals, thus dropping fellow Republican Edward R. Finch who had been nominated by the Democrats in a common cross-endorsement deal for judicial officers.

The "Recovery Party" filed a petition to nominate state officers on October 9, 1934. The ticket was headed by Ex-Mayor of New York John F. Hylan for governor. The ticket was not allowed on the ballot because of numerous forged signatures and thus not meeting the legal requirements. Hylan did receive 15,208 write-in votes in New York City according to NYC Board of Elections records, but these were included in the state total of blank, void and scattering votes (141,700).

The "Constitutional Party" nominated Colonel Henry Breckinridge, a Democrat who opposed President Franklin D. Roosevelt's New Deal policy, for the U.S. Senate, and used the "Pine Tree of Liberty" as its emblem on the ballot.

Result
The whole Democratic ticket was elected in the third landslide in a row.

The incumbents Lehman, Bray, Tremaine, Bennett, Loughran and Copeland were re-elected.

The Law Preservation Party lost its automatic ballot access and disappeared.

Notes

Sources
Result (Law Preservation only): Vote for Prohibition candidates at Prohibitionists.org
Official Result: DRY PARTY LOSES PLACE ON BALLOT in NYT on December 11, 1934
New York Red Book 1935

See also
New York gubernatorial elections
New York state elections

 
November 1934 events